The John Llewellyn Rhys Prize was a literary prize awarded annually for the best work of literature (fiction, non-fiction, poetry, drama) by an author from the Commonwealth aged 35 or under, written in English and published in the United Kingdom. Established in 1942, it was one of the oldest literary awards in the UK.

Since 2011, the award has been suspended by funding problems. The last award was in 2010.

History
The prize was initiated in 1942 by Jane Oliver in memory of her husband, John Llewellyn Rhys, a young author who was killed on 5 August 1940 while serving as a bomber pilot in the Royal Air Force.

From 1987 to 2003, the prize was funded by the Mail on Sunday.  The newspaper withdrew in 2003, after the 2002 prize was awarded to Mary Laven.  Subsequently, the prize was sponsored by Booktrust, an independent educational charity, but in June 2011 the award was suspended due to funding problems. Booktrust said that it "strongly" intended to bring the award "back with a bang as soon as possible" as it looked for outside funding sources.

In 2010, the winner received £5,000, while the runners-up each received £500.

Winners (1942–1999)
Source: 1942–2003

Winners and short lists (since 2000)
Source: 2007–2010

*Note: The 2002 prize was initially awarded to Hari Kunzru for his book The Impressionist on 20 November 2003, but the author decided to decline the award due to its sponsorship by The Mail on Sunday.

See also

 List of British literary awards
 List of literary awards
 List of years in literature

References

External links
John Llewellyn Rhys Prize, official site at Booktrust. Retrieved 29 January 2011.

 
Awards established in 1942
1942 establishments in the United Kingdom
2010 disestablishments in the United Kingdom
English literary awards
Literary awards honouring young writers
British poetry awards
Awards disestablished in 2010